The Hill Country Transit District operates a bus service known as The HOP in the Killeen-Temple-Fort Hood metropolitan area and the surrounding rural areas. The HOP operates two bus services: Fixed Route and its Rural Service. Its fixed route service operates scheduled stops in the urban areas of Killeen, Temple, Belton, Copperas Cove and Harker Heights. The district is governed by a board of directors with a representative of each county and major city served and is a member of the Killeen Temple Metropolitan Planning Organization. Funding for the district comes from transit fares, the Federal Transit Administration, Texas Department of Transportation (TxDOT), contract revenue from Medicaid, and contributions from the counties and cities served.

Routes

The following route list is the Urban fixed routes that The HOP maintains in the urban areas of the Killeen-Temple-Fort Hood metropolitan area.

Former Routes

References

External links 

Bus transportation in Texas
Transportation in Bell County, Texas